Eadestown is a Gaelic Athletic Association (GAA) club in County Kildare, Ireland based in the smallest parish in the diocese of Dublin. Previously, Ballymore Eustace and Eadestown combined for minor purposes under the name Oliver Plunkett's. However, since 2012, Eadestown have fielded their own minor team.

History
RIC records from 1890 show that Eadestown Seaghan O'Neills had 40 members. Between 1910 and 1912 the name of the team was changed from Rathmore Rovers to Eadestown.

2005 saw the installation of floodlights, nets behind goals, pitch drainage system and a path around the pitch. In 2006, wooden railings, a large advertising hoarding, a sign at the entrance and a digital scoreboard were added.

Achievements
 Kildare Senior Football Championship: (1) 1970
 All-Ireland Junior Ladies Club Football Championship (1) 2006

 Larry Tompkins, member of the Kildare Gaelic Football team of the millennium
 Emmet Bolton
 Larry Coughlan, Offaly All-Ireland winning player

References

External links
 Official Eadestown GAA site
 Kildare GAA site
 Kildare GAA club sites
 Kildare on Hoganstand.com

Gaelic games clubs in County Kildare
Gaelic football clubs in County Kildare